Foumiret is a settlement in the Sahara Desert of western Algeria near Nepka.

Geography of Adrar Province